Semyon Arkadyevich Bagdasarov (born November 20, 1954 in Margilan, Uzbek SSR) is a Russian politician and member of the State Duma of the Russian Federation. He is a member of A Just Russia.

He has studied at the Military Institute of the Red Star and has learnt Dari. As a political analyst, he concentrates on Central Asian and Middle Eastern affairs.

In October 2015, amidst the Russian intervention in Syria, Bagdasarov, argued that the historical tradition of Eastern Orthodoxy in Syria made it a “holy land” for Russians and “their” land. Hence he stated that there was “no Orthodoxy or Russia without Syria”.

He is an ethnic Armenian.

References 

Living people
Russian people of Armenian descent
1954 births
Fifth convocation members of the State Duma (Russian Federation)
Ethnic Armenian politicians
People from Margilan
A Just Russia politicians
21st-century Russian politicians
Uzbekistani people of Armenian descent